Downings or Downies is a Gaeltacht village and townland on the Ros Goill peninsula in County Donegal, Ireland. The village is on the shores of Sheep Haven on the north coast of Ireland.

Name
The name probably means 'The Forts', referring to the wealth of hill forts in the area. The full original Irish name seems to have been . Or the name could be a hibernicisation of the English name, to describe the sandy dunes connecting the peninsula to the County Donegal mainland.

Economy

Downings used to be a significant fishing port with a substantial herring fleet. Today, the economy survives on partly tourism. Na Dúnaibh is home to the famous McNutt of Donegal tweed factory and shop. It is also home to McBride Fishing who operate three crab fishing boats and the highly regarded online fishing industry news platform The Fishing Daily. Downings also boasts Meevagh Boatyard on Mulroy Bay which was established in the early 1900s by the Congested District Board to build fishing boats for local fishermen during the herring boom. Situated as it is on Sheep Haven, Downings is one of the safest anchorages on the north coast of Ireland, and is a must for an overnight stay for anyone sailing along the Donegal coast

History
In 2007 local divers recovered a gun from the wreck of HMS  at the mouth of Lough Swilly. The gun is now mounted beside Downings Pier.

Recreation
The dunes that link the Rosguill peninsula to the mainland are also home to the Rosapenna Links course designed by Old Tom Morris, and although the original hotel and clubhouse that was patronised by the likes of John Wayne and Errol Flynn burnt down in the sixties, the new buildings seek to emulate the charm of the originals.

Downings is the start and finish of the Atlantic Drive, one of the most dramatic scenic routes in Ireland.

People
 The Most Rev. Dr Philip Boyce, Lord Bishop Emeritus of Raphoe. He served as the Lord Bishop of Raphoe from October 1995 to June 2017.
 Maxi Curran, Gaelic football manager

See also
List of towns and villages in Ireland

References

External links
 Downings GAA Club

Gaeltacht places in County Donegal
Gaeltacht towns and villages
Downies
Towns and villages in County Donegal